Bangladesh competed at the 2022 Commonwealth Games at Birmingham, England but did not win any medals. It was the team's tenth appearance at the Commonwealth Games.

Boxer Sura Chakma and weightlifter Mabia Akhter were the country's flagbearers during the opening ceremony.

Competitors
The following is the list of number of competitors participating at the Games per sport/discipline.

Athletics

Men
Track and road events

Field events

Women
Track and road events

Field events

Boxing

Men

Gymnastics

Artistic
Team Final & Individual Qualification

Swimming

Men

Women

Table tennis

Bangladesh qualified a men's team for the table tennis competitions.

Singles

Doubles

Team

Weightlifting

Two weightlifters qualified through their positions in the IWF Commonwealth Ranking List (as of 9 March 2022).

Wrestling

References

External links
Bangladesh Olympic Association Official site

2022
Nations at the 2022 Commonwealth Games
Commonwealth Games